Rydal railway station is a heritage-listed railway station located on the Main Western line in Rydal, City of Lithgow, New South Wales, Australia. It is also known as Rydal Railway Station group. The property was added to the New South Wales State Heritage Register on 2 April 1999.

History
The station opened on 1 July 1870 and was the next finished extension west from Lithgow after Wallerawang had been finalised four months earlier. Two years later the line was again extended finishing at  before reaching  in 1876.

On 14 March 1915, the line was duplicated with a second platform built. The station closed on 27 May 1989, with the track lifted from the 1915 built platform in 1998 when the line was singled.

The station building has been converted to a library.

Description 
The complex comprises:
Station / residence - type 1 - sub-type 2, 1869
Signal box - type 3, small, 
Platform faces - stone and brick
War memorial

Services
The XPT only stops on request if passengers have booked to board/alight here. From 16 September 2019 the 4 times daily Bathurst Bullet also stops here.

Heritage listing 
As at 27 November 2000, the station building was constructed when the line opened to Rydal and retains its original form from that period. It is an important early railway complex that maintains its setting (largely through main road bypass) and which forms an important visual element in the valley viewed from both road approaches and from the level crossing. The changing view of the structure from the road is the visual focus of the town which is now a remnant of its previous importance as a centre for the production of fine wool.
The station building symbolises the confidence in railway construction and the transition towards a railway architecture. It is a rare example of a combined station/residence, five of which remain. All similar structures, found further west towards Blayney, have major alteration or extensions.
The other items on the site are significant as they indicate the development of the system and how early sites adapted to duplication and increased traffic followed by more recently decreased traffic.

Rydal railway station was listed on the New South Wales State Heritage Register on 2 April 1999 having satisfied the following criteria.

The place possesses uncommon, rare or endangered aspects of the cultural or natural history of New South Wales.

This item is assessed as historically rare. This item is assessed as scientifically rare. This item is assessed as arch. rare. This item is assessed as socially rare.

See also

List of railway stations in regional New South Wales

References

Bibliography

Attribution

External links

Rydal station details Transport for New South Wales

Easy Access railway stations in New South Wales
Railway stations in Australia opened in 1870
Regional railway stations in New South Wales
New South Wales State Heritage Register
Rydal, New South Wales
Houses in New South Wales
Hotels in New South Wales
Articles incorporating text from the New South Wales State Heritage Register
Main Western railway line, New South Wales